The comics page of a daily newspaper is a page largely or entirely devoted to comic strips.

Summary
Some other features that frequently appear on the comics page are crossword puzzles and horoscopes. Other special pages in newspapers include the sports page and the society page.

Some well-known comics on the comics page are Garfield, the first superman comics, and classics such as peanuts. The comic page was also used occasionally used to spread propaganda, such as Korea My Home.  

Many issues such as sex, narcotics, and terrorism cannot or can rarely be openly discussed in strips, although there are exceptions, usually for satire, as in Bloom County. This led some cartoonists to resort to double entendre or dialogues children do not understand, as in Greg Evans' Luann. Young cartoonists have claimed commonplace words, images and issues should be allowed in the comics. Some of the taboo words and topics are mentioned daily on television and other forms of visual media. Webcomics and comics distributed primarily to college newspapers are much freer in this respect.

Violence on the comics page is generally kept to a fantasy level. While black eyes and bandages covering wounds can be shown, the shedding of blood itself is prohibited in North American comic strips. The aftermath of spousal abuse is shown; the violent act itself is never shown on the comics pages. Most comics are episodic, with each storyline lasting for 3-5 days before being dropped in favor of a new storyline.

References

Newspapers
Comic strips